Ludomir Różycki (18 September 1883 Warsaw – 1 January 1953 Katowice) was a Polish composer and conductor.  He was, with Mieczysław Karłowicz, Karol Szymanowski and Grzegorz Fitelberg, a member of the group of composers known as Young Poland, the intention of which was to invigorate the musical culture of their generation in their mother country.

Life
He was a son of a professor at the Warsaw Conservatory, where he studied piano and composition. He completed his studies with distinction, and then continued his studies in Berlin at the Academy of Music under Engelbert Humperdinck. He began his musical career as a conductor of opera and professor of piano in Lwów in 1907. It was while in Lwów that he began to compose. Subsequently, he moved to Warsaw but had to flee during the Warsaw Uprising. After the war, he lived and taught in Katowice.

Music
Różycki's ballet Pan Twardowski (1920) was the first Polish large-scale ballet to be performed abroad, being seen in Copenhagen, Prague, Brno, Zagreb, Belgrade and Vienna, and being performed over 800 times in Warsaw.  His eight operas included Casanova and Eros i Psyche (Eros and Psyche, to the libretto of Jerzy Żuławski), the latter having its world premiere in Wrocław in 1917.

A significant number of his solo piano pieces have been recorded on CD by Valentina Seferinova, and issued on the Polish Acte Préalable label (catalogue reference AP 0263) as world premiere recordings.

Hyperion Records have released recordings of his two piano concertos, his piano quintet and his string quartet.

In 1944 Różycki began writing a violin concerto but had to leave the manuscript buried in his garden when he fled Warsaw. Discovered years later by construction workers, the score ended up in the archives of the National Library of Poland. Violinist Janusz Wawrowski later restored the work, performed the premiere in 2018, and released a recording in 2021.

See also
Music of Poland
List of Poles

References

External links
Ludomir Różycki at culture.pl

1883 births
1953 deaths
20th-century classical composers
Polish classical composers
Polish male classical composers
Musicians from Warsaw
Chopin University of Music alumni
Polish music educators
Pupils of Engelbert Humperdinck
Academic staff of Lviv Conservatory
20th-century male musicians
Recipients of the State Award Badge (Poland)